SaltCreek Casino, located in Pocasset, Oklahoma, is the first casino to open in Grady County, Oklahoma. It is the 18th casino owned and operated by the Chickasaw Nation. The casino held a ribbon cutting ceremony on December 18, 2012 and officially opened its doors on December 31, 2012. The   casino, features 600 different gaming stations, as well as four table games - three Blackjack tables and one for Ultimate Texas Hold’em.
At SaltCreek Casino there is one restaurant and one bar. The Brook Bar located in the center of the casino, seats 16, and serves an assortment of beer, wine and liquor. The Fork Café serves home-style food such as chicken fried steak, hamburgers and blue-plate specials. The casino's gift shop, Reflections, also sells Bedré Fine Chocolate, which is also tribally owned.

References

External links
Official website

Casinos in Oklahoma
Chickasaw Nation casinos
Buildings and structures in Grady County, Oklahoma
Tourist attractions in Grady County, Oklahoma
2012 establishments in Oklahoma